Hot R&B/Hip-Hop Songs is a chart published by Billboard that ranks the top-performing songs in the United States in African-American-oriented musical genres; the chart has undergone various name changes since its launch in 1942 to reflect the evolution of such genres.  In 1980, it was published under the title Hot Soul Singles.  During that year, 14 different singles topped the chart, based on playlists submitted by radio stations and surveys of retail sales outlets.

In the issue of Billboard dated January 5, Michael Jackson's "Rock with You" moved up to number one, a position it would hold for six consecutive weeks; it was the second consecutive single from his breakthrough Off the Wall album to reach the peak position.  In May, Jackson's brother Jermaine gained his first solo chart-topper with "Let’s Get Serious", which also spent six weeks at number one.  Stevie Wonder spent one more week in the top spot with "Master Blaster (Jammin')", his tribute to reggae singer Bob Marley; its seven weeks atop the chart was the year's longest unbroken run at number one.  No act achieved more than one number one during 1980.  "Rock With You" and "Upside Down" by Diana Ross were the only two soul chart-toppers of 1980 to also reach number one on the all-genre Hot 100 chart.

Five other acts reached the top spot for the first time in 1980, beginning in February with Shalamar.  The act masterminded by Dick Griffey, booking agent for TV's Soul Train, topped the chart for a single week with "The Second Time Around".  The S.O.S. Band reached number one for the first and only time with "Take Your Time (Do It Right) [Part 1]", which spent five weeks in the top spot.  George Benson gained his first chart-topper with "Give Me the Night", five years after he first charted, immediately after which jazz trumpeter Tom Browne reached number one with "Funkin’ For Jamaica", his first single to enter the listing.  It was the first of eight singles by Browne to enter the soul chart, none of which entered the Hot 100 at all.  Ray, Goodman & Brown reached number one on the soul chart with their first entry under that name, having previously topped the chart in 1970 and 1975 as the Moments.  Larry Graham achieved his first solo number one, having spent time in the top spot as a member of Sly & the Family Stone and as the frontman of Graham Central Station.  The year's final number one was "Celebration" by Kool & the Gang, which first reached the top of the chart in the issue of Billboard dated December 20.

Chart history

References

1980
1980 record charts
1980 in American music